José Luis Elias (born 8 December 1954) is a Peruvian sprinter. He competed in the men's 100 metres at the 1980 Summer Olympics.

References

1954 births
Living people
Athletes (track and field) at the 1980 Summer Olympics
Peruvian male sprinters
Olympic athletes of Peru
Place of birth missing (living people)